Sitaram means Sita and Rama. It is also used as a greeting by Hindus in the Hindi Belt especially in the Awadh, Bhojpur, and Mithila regions as well as being used by the diaspora in Fiji, Guyana, Mauritius, Suriname, and Trinidad and Tobago. Persons having this name include:
 Raja Sitaram Ray (1658–1714), Bengali hero who fought against the Mughal Empire
 Sitaram Lalas (1912 – 1986),  linguist and lexicographer, authored Rajasthani Sabad Kosh
 K. N. Sitaram (1889–1940), first Indian to head the famous Central Museum, Lahore
 Sitaram Chaturvedi (1907 – 2005), Indian educator
 Sitaram Kesri (1919 – 2000), Indian Politician and President of Indian National Congress
 Sitaram Singh (1948 – 2014), member of the 14th Lok Sabha of India
 Sitaram Yadav (1946), member of the 14th Lok Sabha of India
 Sitaram Yechury (1952), Indian politician and senior member of the politburo of the Communist Party of India (Marxist)
 Sitaram Kattel, or Dhurmus, is a Nepalese comedian, actor, script writer

References

Indian given names
Greeting words and phrases